Sarcohyla chryses, also known as the golden treefrog, is a species of frog in the family Hylidae. It is endemic to the Sierra Madre del Sur in Guerrero, Mexico. Its sister species is Sarcohyla mykter.

It breeds in streams. It is threatened by habitat loss and potentially also by chytridiomycosis. It is present in Parque Nacional Guerrero .

References

chryses
Endemic amphibians of Mexico
Fauna of the Sierra Madre del Sur
Amphibians described in 1965
Taxonomy articles created by Polbot